Guy Martel is a French spree killer who killed seven people and wounded at least five others in several towns and villages in the departments Ille-et-Vilaine and Cotes-du-Nord on June 19, 1985, before he was arrested.

Life
Guy Martel was born in Paris in 1944 during the Nazi occupation of France. His father Victor was a member of the garde mobile, and he had three sisters. Martel earned a degree in mathematics and chemistry, joined the military and was sent to Costa Rica, where he taught in San José. He rarely spoke about his time there, but related that he had seen horrible things and had to perform the duties of someone of higher rank who had been killed. In 1969 Martel had been taken hostage by guerrilleros for three weeks; he was flown back to France. upon his release. From then on Martel complained about being ill, saying he had caught a virus and suffered from intestinal and spinal pain.

Martel accepted a position as a natural sciences teacher at Henri Matisse college in Issy-les-Moulineaux. However, in 1972, after less than two years, he was forced to quit due to a nervous disorder and was put on a long term disability leave. Afterwards he had briefly sent to mental institutions three times – once in Paris, and twice in Brittany – and was accorded a degree of disability of 80%. In 1975, Martel was granted a disability pension and moved in with his parents in Baguer-Morvan. When his mother died from a heart attack in 1976, his condition began to deteriorate and he saw hostility everywhere. Due to a growing discord between him and his father, Martel decided to live alone and bought a house in Dol-de-Bretagne in 1979.

In Dol-de-Bretagne, Martel rarely left his home except to lie in his garden or to play tennis at a local sports hall. He also ate lunch every day at a home for elderly people. Besides his father; his uncle Charles; and his physician, a Dr Launay, Martel had no visitors and consequently was known as "monsieur tout seul" (Mr. All Alone) throughout the village. Martel generally was quickly fatigued and complained a lot about noise, especially those made by children, whom he called loud and annoying. One day, when a child pressed Martel's doorbell and ran away, he came out angrily, shouting: "If you do that again, I will kill you!"

Shooting
On May 19, at about 10 a.m. Martel and his father had an apparent argument during a visit. After his father had left Martel's house, Martel took his .22 caliber rifle with scope, put them in the trunk of his car along with a box of cartridges, and drove to the house of his father in Baguer-Morvan. Finding that his father was not yet home, Martel drove back to Dol-de-Bretagne, where he arrived at approximately 11 a.m. at the home of his uncle, 64-year-old Charles Martel, who was picking cherries. Martel first had a normal conversation with him, but eventually returned to his car, retrieved his rifle and shot Charles three times, wounding him. He also shot at, but missed, one of his cousins.

Martel then drove to the retirement home, where he entered the kitchen. When the cook, Mrs. Lozac'h, explained that it was not yet time to eat, he replied that he would come back later ("Je reviendrai tout à l'heure.") and shot at her, grazing her head. Martel left again and proceeded to Dr. Launay's office. There he entered the office of Launay's colleague, Michel Lhommelet, and killed him with four shots to the back as he was examining a child. He next stopped at the sports hall; entered the office of the manager, a Mrs. Le Maréchal; and shot her dead. Martel then drove back to Baguer-Morvan and found his father just arriving at his house. Martel killed him by shooting him several times. Reports of the loose gunman had spread in Dol-de-Bretagne by this time, while police began their search operation.

Martel made his way to Rocher-Aoustin, near Combourg, where he killed another uncle, Joseph Weber, with a shot from his rifle. In La Chapelle-aux-Filtzméens, Martel shot at the brothers Jean and Eugène Chaussonnière, killing the former and seriously wounding the latter. In Saint-Domineuc, Pierre Bourtourault was shot dead when gathering hay at the roadside. In Quebriac, Martel killed 33-year-old Danièle Pomard, whose body was found at 13:35 by garbage collectors.

Near Trévérien, Martel shot and wounded 29-year-old André Rehault on his tractor. He was eventually spotted by a police helicopter and drove into Cotes-du-Nord. On his way, Martel wounded 34-year-old Daniel Lebreton, who was eating lunch in his truck near Saint-Judoce, and 40-year-old Bernard Prechoux in Saint-Juvat. Martel afterwards fired at three other persons before finally being stopped by police in Saint-André-des-Eaux at around 14:00. He stepped out of his car, hands raised and yelling: "Don't shoot! I am sick!" ("Ne tirez pas! Je suis malade!") and was arrested.

Being asked about the reason for the shooting, Martel explained that at first he had business with his family and a few others, but upon realizing that it was easy to shoot people, he simply continued. ("Au début, je n'avais affaire qu'à ma famille et à quelques autres personnes... Après, j'ai réalisé que c'était facile de tirer. Alors, j'ai continué.")

Victims
Pierre Bourtourault, 74
Jean Chaussonnière, 60
Mrs. Le Maréchal
Michel Lhommelet, 34
Victor Martel, 65, father of Guy Martel
Danièle Pomard, 33
Joseph Weber, 65, uncle of Guy Martel

See also
Christian Dornier
Eric Borel
Nanterre massacre

References

French spree killers
1985 in France
Mass murder in 1985
Patricides
Massacres in France
1940s births
Living people
People from Ille-et-Vilaine
1985 mass shootings in Europe